Pinzón Island (Spanish: Isla Pinzón), sometimes called Duncan Island (after Adam Duncan, 1st Viscount Duncan), is an island in the Galápagos Islands, Ecuador.

Pinzón is home to giant Galápagos tortoises of the endemic subspecies Chelonoidis duncanensis, Galápagos sea lions and other endemic species. It has no visitor facilities and a permit is required to visit.

It has an area of 18 km2 and a maximum altitude of 458 meters.

Pinzón marks the geographical center of the Galápagos Islands, but neither of the two main Galápagos tree species are present. A unique species of daisy tree is found in the humid zone.

Restoration
During January 2012, invasive rodents were removed from the island by The Galápagos National Park, assisted by Island Conservation to benefit the Pinzón giant tortoise. An infestation of non-native rats began in the mid 18th century with the arrival of European sailors.  The rats devastated the tortoise population by eating their eggs and young hatchlings that were too small to defend themselves. In December 2014, after 100 years the first new generation of tortoise hatchlings were spotted on Pinzón.

References

Islands of the Galápagos Islands
Island restoration